Pokus may refer to:
 Pokus, fictional characters created by Estonian writer and graphic artist Edgar Valter
 Pokus, a 1992 TV production by Igor Ciel
 Pokus, a 2006 TV production starring Hana Vagnerová

See also 
 Poku
 Pocus
 Hocus Pocus (disambiguation)